Salvagno is an Italian surname. Notable persons with this name include:
Angela Salvagno (born 1976), American bodybuilder
Leandro Salvagno Rattaro (born 1984), Uruguayan rower
Maria Aurora Salvagno (born 1986), Italian sprinter
Caitlin Salvagno (born 1999), American photographer